The Corey–Seebach reaction, or Seebach Umpolung is a name reaction of organic chemistry that allows for acylation by converting aldehydes into lithiated 1,3-dithianes. The lithiated 1,3-dithianes serves as an acyl anion equivalent, undergoing alkylation with electrophiles. The reaction is of pedagogical value, but it is cumbersome, so it is not widely used.

Implementation
The aldehyde is first converted into a dithiane, usually with 1,3-propanedithiol. The resulting 1,3-dithiane is then lithiated with the use of butyllithium. The 2-lithio-1,3-dithiane reacts with electrophiles to give a 2-alkyl-1,3-dithiane.

Finally, the  2-alkyl-1,3-dithiane can be converted to a carbonyl by hydrolysis, usually with the use of mercury(II) oxide.  Alternatively the  2-alkyl-1,3-dithiane can be reduced to an alkane.

Scope
The lithiated 1,3-dithiane can react with alkyl halides, epoxides, ketones, acyl halides, and iminium salts, which after hydrolysis of dithioacetals can yield ketones, β-hydroxyketones, α-hydroxyketones, 1,2-diketones and α-aminoketones. Notably, α-hydroxyketones and 1,2-diketones can not be generated through typical reactions of aldehydes such as the aldol reaction. Other possible electrophiles include aldehydes, amides, and esters.

The reaction between lithiated 1,3-dithianes and arenesulfonates offers a similar path to that of alkyl halides, being able to form dithioacetals which can be converted to ketones.

References

Name reactions